This is a list of moths of the family Eupterotidae that are found in India. It also acts as an index to the species articles and forms part of the full List of moths of India.

Genus Gangarides
 Gangarides roseus Walker
Note that Gangarides is now placed in the family Notodontidae the placement here is sensu Hampson, 1892

Genus Pandala
 Pandala dolosa Walker

Genus Melanothrix
 Melanothrix leucotrigona Hampson

Genus Dreata
 Dreata hades Walker

Genus Palirisa
 Palirisa lineosa Walker
 Palirisa cervina Moore

Genus Tagora
 Tagora patula Walker
 Tagora pallida Walker
 Tagora nigriceps Hampson
 Tagora murina Moore

Genus Pseudojana
 Pseudojana incandescens Walker

Genus Ganisa
 Ganisa postica Walker
 Ganisa pandya Moore
 Ganisa glaucescens Walker

Genus Apha
 Apha subdives Walker
 Apha floralis Butler
 Apha fenestrata Butler

Genus Apona
 Apona cashmirensis Kollar
 Apona plumosa Moore
 Apona shevaroyensis Moore

Genus Eupterote
 Eupterote undata Blanch
 Eupterote fabia Cramer
 Eupterote mollifera Walker
 Eupterote flavicollis Otter
 Eupterote diffusa Walker
 Eupterote primularis Moore
 Eupterote geminata Walker
 Eupterote minor Moore
 Eupterote lineosa Walker
 Eupterote undans Walker
 Eupterote testacea Walker
 Eupterote translata Swinhoe
 Eupterote flavida Moore
 Eupterote plumipes Walker
 Eupterote vialis Moore
 Eupterote citrina Walker
 Eupterote unicolor Hampson

Genus Nisaga
 Nisaga simplex Walker

Genus Sangatissa
 Sangatissa subcurvifera Walker

Genus Cnethocampa
 Cnethocampa cheela Moore

See also
Eupterotidae
Moths
Lepidoptera
List of moths of India

References

 Hampson, G.F. et al. (1892-1937) Fauna of British India, Including Ceylon and Burma: Moths. Vols. 1-5 cxix + 2813 p - 1295 figs - 1 table - 15 pl (12 in col.)

 

M